Vigliano Biellese is a comune (municipality) in the Province of Biella in the Italian region Piedmont, located about  northeast of Turin and about  southeast of Biella.

Vigliano Biellese borders the following municipalities: Biella, Candelo, Cerreto Castello, Cossato, Ronco Biellese, Valdengo.

Notable people
 Aldo Brovarone (1926–2020), automobile designer.

References

External links
 Official website
 Pro Loco
 Church: Organ

Cities and towns in Piedmont